Ricardo Antonio Pinto Valera (born January 20, 1994) is a Venezuelan professional baseball pitcher for the Tecolotes de los Dos Laredos of the Mexican League. He previously played in Major League Baseball (MLB) for the Philadelphia Phillies and Tampa Bay Rays, in the KBO League for the SK Wyverns, and in the Chinese Professional Baseball League (CPBL) for the Rakuten Monkeys.

Career

Philadelphia Phillies
Pinto signed with the Philadelphia Phillies as an international free agent in December 2011. He made his professional debut with the Venezuelan Summer League Phillies in 2012 and also played with them in 2013. In 2014, he played for the Williamsport Crosscutters. Pinto spent 2015 with the Lakewood BlueClaws and Clearwater Threshers. He won the Paul Owens Award as the Phillies Minor League Pitcher of the Year after going 15–4 with a 2.97 earned run average (ERA) and 105 strikeouts. The Phillies added him to their 40-man roster after the 2016 season.

Pinto started the 2017 season with the Lehigh Valley IronPigs, and was called up to Phillies on May 31, making his MLB debut the same day. In his debut against the Miami Marlins, Pinto pitched two innings in relief, allowing four runs on six hits along with three walks and a home run, and struck out two. On March 25, 2018, the Phillies designated Pinto for assignment.

Chicago White Sox
On March 28, 2018, Pinto was traded to the Chicago White Sox in exchange for international signing bonus pool money. He was designated for assignment on May 28, 2018. He cleared waivers and was outrighted to the Class AAA Charlotte Knights. Pinto elected free agency on November 2, 2018.

Tampa Bay Rays
On January 28, 2019, Pinto signed a minor league deal with the Tampa Bay Rays. On August 30, the Rays selected Pinto's contract.

San Francisco Giants
On September 6, 2019, the San Francisco Giants claimed Pinto off waivers from the Rays. Pinto was designated for assignment on November 5.

SK Wyverns
Pinto was released by the Giants on November 12, so he could sign with the SK Wyverns of the KBO League. He became a free agent following the season. In one season of work in the KBO, Pinto pitched to a 6-15 record with a 6.17 ERA and 112 strikeouts in 162 innings of work.

Detroit Tigers
On February 20, 2021, Pinto signed a minor league contract with the Detroit Tigers organization. Pinto split the year between the Double-A Erie SeaWolves and the Triple-A Toledo Mud Hens, recording a cumulative 14-4 record and 4.29 ERA with 107 strikeouts in 123.2 innings of work between the two teams. He elected minor league free agency following the season on November 7. 

On March 13, 2022, Pinto re-signed with the Tigers organization on a new minor league deal. He was released on July 3, 2022.

Rakuten Monkeys
On July 28, 2022, Pinto signed with the Rakuten Monkeys of the Chinese Professional Baseball League. Pinto appeared in 4 games (3 starts) for Rakuten, struggling to a 1-2 record and 6.06 ERA with 9 strikeouts in 16.1 innings pitched.

Tecolotes de los Dos Laredos
On February 8, 2023, Pinto signed with the Tecolotes de los Dos Laredos of the Mexican League.

References

External links

1994 births
Living people
Charlotte Knights players
Clearwater Threshers players
Durham Bulls players
Lakewood BlueClaws players
Lehigh Valley IronPigs players
Major League Baseball pitchers
Major League Baseball players from Venezuela
Montgomery Biscuits players
People from Carabobo
Philadelphia Phillies players
Rakuten Monkeys players
Reading Fightin Phils players
SSG Landers players
Tampa Bay Rays players
Tiburones de La Guaira players
Venezuelan expatriate baseball players in South Korea
Venezuelan expatriate baseball players in Taiwan
Venezuelan expatriate baseball players in the United States
Venezuelan Summer League Phillies players
Williamsport Crosscutters players
Winston-Salem Dash players